Mike Dubuisson (born September 30, 1991) is a Canadian football defensive back for the BC Lions of the Canadian Football League (CFL). He previously played CIS football for the University of Montreal and the University of Windsor.

College career 

Dubuisson played college football for the Montreal Carabins in 2011 and the Windsor Lancers in 2013. Between his two college seasons, he achieved 58 tackles, six interceptions, and one sack.

Professional career

Edmonton Eskimos 
The Edmonton Eskimos acquired Dubuisson through the 2014 CFL Supplemental Draft, which is an auction-style draft used to allocate players who did not receive approval as a national player by the time of the 2014 CFL Draft. The Eskimos gave up a fifth round pick in the 2015 CFL Draft to receive Dubuisson. In his rookie year, he played in all 18 regular season games for the Eskimos, and was active on special teams in their post-season West Semi-Final game. In 2015, he dressed in all 18 regular season games again, registering seven special teams tackles. He also played in the West Final and 103rd Grey Cup, earning his first Grey Cup championship. He played in 17 games in 2016 where he had two defensive tackles and three special teams tackles.

Saskatchewan Roughriders 
Dubuisson signed with the Saskatchewan Roughriders in 2017, but saw action in only two games, making four defensive tackles and one special teams tackle in those outings.

BC Lions 
Dubuisson signed with the BC Lions on February 15, 2018.

Edmonton Elks
The Elks announced the signing of Dubuisson on January 3, 2022.

References 

1991 births
Living people
Edmonton Elks players
Canadian football defensive backs
Montreal Carabins football players
Windsor Lancers football players
Players of Canadian football from Quebec
Canadian football people from Montreal
Saskatchewan Roughriders players
BC Lions players